E126 or E-126 may refer to:
 Unbihexium, a hypothetical chemical element with atomic number 126
 Ponceau 6R, a red dye sometimes used as a food colorant with E number E126
 Enercon E-126, a wind turbine